Allan Scott (born 27 December 1982) is a Scottish hurdler. Scott, a member of the Shaftesbury Barnet Harriers athletics club, represented Great Britain at the 2008 Beijing Olympics.

Competition record

References
Team GB Page

Power of 10 profile for Allan Scott

External links
 
 
 
 

1982 births
Living people
Scottish male hurdlers
Olympic athletes of Great Britain
Athletes (track and field) at the 2008 Summer Olympics
Commonwealth Games competitors for Scotland
Athletes (track and field) at the 2006 Commonwealth Games
World Athletics Championships athletes for Great Britain
Competitors at the 2005 Summer Universiade